Frias, Frías or FRIAS may refer to:

Places
Frías, Province of Burgos, Castile and León, Spain
Frias Castle
Frías de Albarracín, Aragon, Spain
Frías District, Peru
Frías, Santiago del Estero, Argentina
Comandancia Frías, Argentina

People
Frías (name), and Frias, including a list of people with the name
Duke of Frías, a Spanish hereditary title

Other uses
Fellow of the Royal Incorporation of Architects in Scotland (FRIAS)
Freiburg Institute for Advanced Studies (FRIAS)

See also
 
 
Octávio Frias de Oliveira Bridge, in São Paulo, Brazil
Tomás Frías Autonomous University, in Bolivia
Tomás Frías Province, in Bolivia